The picturesque lake Körbersee is east of the village Schröcken at 1600 m amsl in Austria. It lies within the "Lechtaler" Alps in Vorarlberg. The lake can only be reached on foot; estimated walking time 45 minutes.

With a surface of ~ 5 ha it is a smaller lake in the province. The water possesses excellent drinking water quality and gives a protected living space to fishes and rare plants. The mighty "Widderstein" mount is reflected by the clear, cold water and is a remarkable view for hikers. Near the lake alpine economy can be found; perfect for small snacks.

A little bit deeper is another lake called "Kalbelesee". Its data are almost identical with the Körbersee. The whole lake area is a nature reserve.

Lakes of Vorarlberg
Nature reserves in Austria
LKorbersee